Arthrographis is a genus of fungi that are widespread in the environment and occasionally cause infection in animals. Arthrographis species have been found worldwide in samples from air, compost, marine sediment, soil, wood, and human infection.

The genus was first described by G. Cochet in 1976, with the type species being Arthrographis kalrae

References

Dothideomycetes genera